Francis Carpenter (1910–1973) was an American child actor active in films of the silent era. He co-starred with Virginia Lee Corbin in several film such as Jack and the Beanstalk.

Selected filmography
 Old Heidelberg (1915)
 The Commanding Officer (1915)
 Macbeth (1916)
 Martha's Vindication (1916)
 Intolerance (1916)
 Let Katie Do It (1916)
 Aladdin and the Wonderful Lamp (1917)
 Jack and the Beanstalk (1917)
 The Babes in the Woods (1917)
 True Blue (1918)
 Treasure Island (1918)
 The Forbidden Room (1919)
 Rip Van Winkle (1921)
 The Infamous Miss Revell (1921)
 The Lone Star Ranger (1923)

References

Bibliography
 Solomon, Aubrey. The Fox Film Corporation, 1915-1935: A History and Filmography. McFarland, 2011.

External links

1910 births
1973 deaths
American male film actors
People from Colorado
20th-century American male actors